Radon is a chemical element with symbol Rn and atomic number 86.

Radon may also refer to:

Specifically, the most stable isotope of radon, radon-222
Radon, Orne, a town in France
Johann Radon, Austrian mathematician
Radon transform, a type of mathematical transform
Radon measure, a type of mathematical measure
Radon space, a metric space in mathematics
Rodan, known as Radon in Japanese, a fictional monster in the manner of Godzilla
MSBS Radon, Polish assault rifle
Jaroslav Radoň (born 1986), Czech canoeist
Radon Labs, video game developer in Germany
Nova Radon, an Austrian paraglider design

See also

 Rn (disambiguation)
 Isotopes of radon
 
 
 Raydon, a village and civil parish in Suffolk, England
 Radeon